

N 

 
 
 
 
 
 
 
 
 
 
 
 
 
 
 
 
 
 1906 Naef
 
 845 Naëma
 
 
 
 
 
 
 
 
 
 15350 Naganuma
 
 
 
 
 
 
 
 
 
 
 
 
 
 
 
 
 
 
 
 
 
 
 
 
 
 
 
 
 
 
 
 
 
 
 
 
 
 
 
 
 
 
 
 
 
 
 
 
 
 
 
 
 
 
 
 
 
 4222 Nancita
 2056 Nancy
 
 
 
 
 
 
 
 
 
 
 
 
 
 
 
 
 
 
 
 
 
 
 1203 Nanna
 
 
 559 Nanon
 
 853 Nansenia
 
 
 
 
 
 
 
 
 
 
 
 
 
 
 
 
 
 
 
 68109 Naomipasachoff
 
 
 6025 Naotosato
 
 
 
 
 
 
 
 
 
 
 
 
 
 
 
 
 
 
 
 
 
 
 
 
 
 
 1534 Näsi
 
 
 
 
 534 Nassovia
 
 
 1086 Nata
 
 
 
 448 Natalie
 
 
 
 
 
 
 
 1121 Natascha
 
 
 
 
 
 
 
 
 
 
 
 
 
 
 
 
 
 
 
 
 
 
 
 811 Nauheima
 9712 Nauplius
 
 192 Nausikaa
 
 3688 Navajo
 
 
 
 
 
 
 
 
 
 
 
 
 
 
 
 
 
 903 Nealley
 
 
 
 
 
 
 1223 Neckar
 
 
 3343 Nedzel
 
 
 
 
 
 
 3199 Nefertiti
 
 
 
 
 
 
 
 
 
 
 
 
 
 
 
 
 
 
 
 
 
 1122 Neith
 
 
 
 
 
 
 
 
 51 Nemausa
 
 128 Nemesis
 
 
 
 
 
 20936 Nemrut Dagi
 
 
 
 289 Nenetta
 
 
 2260 Neoptolemus
 431 Nephele
 287 Nephthys
 
 
 4660 Nereus
 
 1318 Nerina
 
 
 
 
 601 Nerthus
 
 
 
 7066 Nessus
 
 
 659 Nestor
 
 
 
 
 
 
 
 
 
 
 
 
 1129 Neujmina
 
 
 
 
 
 
 
 
 
 
 
 
 
 
 
 
 
 
 
 855 Newcombia
 
 
 
 
 
 662 Newtonia
 
 
 
 
 
 
 
 
 
 
 
 
 
 
 
 
 
 
 
 
 
 
 
 
 
 
 
 1831 Nicholson
 
 
 
 
 
 
 
 
 
 
 
 
 
 
 
 
 
 
 843 Nicolaia
 
 
 
 
 
 
 
 
 
 
 
 
 
 
 
 
 
 
 
 
 
 1720 Niels
 
 
 
 
 
 
 
 
 
 
 
 
 
 
 
 
 
 
 
 
 
 
 
 4959 Niinoama
 
 
 
 
 
 
 307 Nike
 
 
 
 
 
 
 
 
 
 
 
 
 1185 Nikko
 
 
 
 
 
 
 
 
 
 
 
 
 
 
 
 
 
 
 
 
 779 Nina
 
 
 
 
 
 
 
 
 357 Ninina
 
 4947 Ninkasi
 
 
 
 71 Niobe
 727 Nipponia
 
 
 
 
 
 
 
 
 
 
 
 
 
 
 
 
 
 
 
 
 
 
 
 
 
 
 
 
 
 
 
 
 
 
 
 
 
 
 
 
 
 
 
 
 
 
 
 
 
 
 
 
 
 
 
 
 
 1298 Nocturna
 1563 Noël
 
 
 
 703 Noëmi
 
 
 1068 Nofretete
 
 
 
 
 
 
 473 Nolli
 
 
 
 
 
 
 
 
 4022 Nonna
 
 
 783 Nora
 
 
 
 
 
 
 
 
 
 
 
 
 
 
 
 555 Norma
 
 
 1256 Normannia
 
 
 
 
 
 
 
 
 
 
 
 
 
 
 
 
 626 Notburga
 
 
 
 
 
 
 
 
 
 
 
 
 
 
 
 
 
 
 
 
 
 
 
 
 
 
 
 
 
 
 
 
 
 
 
 
 
 
 
 1206 Numerowia
 1368 Numidia
 
 
 
 
 
 1696 Nurmela
 
 
 
 
 
 15811 Nüsslein-Volhard
 
 150 Nuwa
 1356 Nyanza
 
 
 
 
 
 
 
 875 Nymphe
 
 
 44 Nysa
 
 3908 Nyx

See also 
 List of minor planet discoverers
 List of observatory codes

References 
 

Lists of minor planets by name